The Holden straight-six motor is a series of straight-six engine that were produced by General Motors Holden at their Port Melbourne plant between 1948 and 1986. The initial Grey motor was so dubbed because of the colour of the cylinder block, later motors came in the form of a Red, Blue, Black, and the four-cylinder Starfire engine. These engines were fitted to all Australian designed Holdens of the same years, and the four-cylinder Starfire notably also found its way into the Toyota Corona (XT130). The Grey motor is a different engine from the others, while the Red, Blue, Black, and even the Starfire are all inter-related with many common parts and castings.

Grey 

The Grey motor, built between 1948 and 1962, earned its name as the engine block was painted grey. This overhead valve engine was first fitted to the Holden 48-215 (and variants) and mated to a three-speed column change gearbox. A three-speed GM Roto-Hydramatic 240 automatic transmission was an option fitted in the latter EK and EJ series. The engine was based on the pre-World War II Buick Straight-6 engine  design, and saw only minor changes throughout its 15-year life.

It displaced  in its original form as used by the 48-215 (1948). It developed 60 brake horsepower (45 kW). This engine remained in production for eight years - until the release of the FE series in 1956. At that point, power was increased to 72hp (53kW) by an increase in the compression ratio to 6.8:1. The compression ratio was increased to 7.8:1. It developed  at 4200 rpm and 120lb.ft (162N.m) at 1400rpm, providing superior performance to the competing four-cylinder Austin, Morris, Vauxhall and Ford of Britain vehicles. The grey motor was a low stress design for high reliability and featured a low compression ratio. Due to sheer ubiquity, they were popular for racing, and were fitted to many open-wheelers, as well as racing Holdens. With the engines' low-end torque, they also found their way into boats and machinery such as forklift trucks.

This engine ran a seven-port non-crossflow cast-iron cylinder head. There were three Siamese (shared) inlet ports for cylinders 1–2, 3–4 and 5–6, two individual exhaust ports for cylinders 1 and 6, and two siamese exhaust ports for cylinders 2–3 and 4–5 in a layout on one side of the head casting. The inlets were fed by a single-barrel Stromberg carburettor in common and fitted with a traditional Kettering ignition by coil and distributor. The electric system was six volts in the 48-215 and FJ. The earliest grey motors (approximately 100,000) were fitted with Delco-Remy accessories, although Lucas and Bosch equivalents throughout the motor's lifetime replaced these.

The very first production grey motor (1948) was number 1001, and they continued in a single sequence until July 1956, when the prefix "L" was introduced. The change affected all engines numbered L283373 and above, signifying the 12-volt negative-earth engines as fitted to the all new FE model. The prefix "U" was introduced for motors with the original electricals as fitted to the FJ utility and panel van models, which ended in February and May 1957 respectively. The change was effective from engine U283384. The prefix "B" was introduced and the number sequence reset with the introduction of the  displacement engine, and ultimately this was replaced by a "J" prefix for motors fitted to EJ vehicles in 1962.

Applications 
 1948–1953 Holden FX
 1948–1953 Holden 48-215 (sedan)
 1951–1953 50-2106 (coupé utility)
 1953 48-215-257 (business/taxi sedan, sometimes abbreviated to 48-217)
 1953–1956 Holden FJ
 1956–1958 Holden FE
 1958–1960 Holden FC
 1960–1961 Holden FB
 1961–1962 Holden EK
 1962–1963 Holden EJ

Red 

Superseding the Grey motor, the Red motor was manufactured between 1963 and 1980. This was a completely new engine and in no way a further development of the grey motor. It featured a seven-bearing crankshaft, full flow oil filter and hydraulic valve lifters. This was a power increase of 33 per cent and 53 per cent over the grey motor.

Red six-cylinder engines manufactured after October 1964 had the cubic inch capacity of the engine cast in raised numbers on the side of the block behind the generator/alternator location. Red engines manufactured prior to October 1964 had either no numbers cast (meaning that it was a 149-cubic-inch engine) or the letters "HP" cast (meaning that it was a 179-cubic-inch engine). All Red engines manufactured prior to April 1967 had forged steel crankshafts. This includes all 149 and 179 ci engines, and 161 and 186 ci engines manufactured before that date.

Capacities
 130 – South Africa, et al. HQ export
 138 – LC & LJ Torana
 149
 161
 173
 179
 186
 202

Applications

Holden Standard, Special, Premier (1963–1968) 
 1963–1965 Holden EH
 1965–1966 Holden HD
 1966–1968 Holden HR

Holden Belmont, Kingswood, Premier (1968–1980) 
 1968–1969 Holden HK
 1969–1970 Holden HT
 1970–1971 Holden HG
 1971–1974 Holden HQ
 1974–1976 Holden HJ
 1976–1977 Holden HX
 1977–1980 Holden HZ

Holden Commodore (1978–1980) 
 1978–1980 Holden Commodore VB

Holden Torana (1969–1979) 
 1969–1971 Holden Torana LC
 1972–1974 Holden Torana LJ
 1974–1975 Holden Torana LH
 1976–1978 Holden Torana LX
 1978–1979 Holden Torana UC

Bedford (1971–1979)
 1971–1979 Bedford CF (Australasian models only)

Blue 

The Blue specification debuted in the 1980 VC Commodore.

The blue motor was a development of the earlier red engine, and incorporated several improvements. The biggest of these changes was the complete redesign of the cylinder head; this was now a 12 port design with individual ports for each cylinder. New revised T5 camshaft. The crankshaft for the 3.3-litre engine now had counterweights on each throw, and stronger connecting rods were used. A two-barrel Varajet carburettor was standard, as was a dual outlet exhaust manifold and a Bosch HEI distributor. It was made in 3.3- and 2.85-litre versions.

Applications 
 1980–1985 Holden WB
 1980–1981 Holden Commodore VC
 1981–1984 Holden Commodore VH

Black 

The Black specification was introduced in the 1984 VK Commodore. The black engine was produced in 3.3-litre displacement only in carbureted and fuel-injected versions. The carbureted engine was almost identical to the previous blue engine, the main difference being in the use of computer controlled spark timing (EST) taking its timing pick-up from the flywheel area. The ports were slightly wider spaced, meaning the manifolds will not simply interchange. The fuel-injected version used Bosch LE2-Jetronic multipoint fuel injection and featured a long-runner intake manifold, 6-3-1 tubular exhaust manifold and a conventional HEI ignition. It also had slightly different cylinder head intake ports for improved breathing (along with location notches for the fuel injectors) and revised camshaft specifications, and delivered superior performance and fuel economy over the carbureted version. This engine was painted red, slightly redder than the earlier "red" motors which looked orange compared to the VK EFI motor.

In the 1986 VL Commodore, Holden replaced the Australian-made and designed six-cylinder engines with the Nissan RB30E and RB20E engines. Pending emission standards and the requirement for unleaded fuel made it difficult to re-engineer the Australian engine.

Applications 
 1984–1986 Holden Commodore VK

Starfire 

This 1.9-litre (1,892 cc) powerplant, known as the Starfire engine, was effectively Holden's existing 2.85-litre 173 cu in straight-six with two cylinders removed. Designed and built in Australia to satisfy local content rules, it first appeared in 1978 during the UC Sunbird's production run, replacing the Opel 1.9-litre cam-in-head unit used in LH, LX and earlier UC Torana/Sunbird 4-cylinder models.

This variant's performance meant the need to push the engine hard leading to fuel consumption similar to the straight-sixes. Due to this, it was often nicknamed as Misfire or Backfire. This engine was replaced in the Australian market by the Camira's OHC Camtech unit, however, it continued to be used until 1986 in New Zealand, where it was used to power four-cylinder versions of the VK Commodore.

This engine was also used by Toyota Australia to meet local parts content regulations for the Corona XT130. Engines installed in Toyotas received some slight differences in the form of a unique camshaft, manifold, and carburettor.

Applications 
 1978–1980 Holden Sunbird (UC) (red block version).
 1980–1981 Holden Commodore VC
 1981–1984 Holden Commodore VH
 1984–1986 Holden Commodore VK (New Zealand)
 1979–1982 Toyota Corona (XT130)

ADR27A Compliance
ADR27A was an Australian Design Rule specifying regulations for fuel evaporative and exhaust emissions for Australian passenger motor vehicles effective from 1 July 1976 in order to reduce air pollution.
The following engines were ADR27A compliant:
 Red (post 1 July 1976 only)
 Blue
 Black
 Starfire

These engines were fitted with emission control systems which generally resulted in reduced engine output. The following table compares the output of the 202ci Red engine in pre- and ADR27A-compliant versions:

See also 
 Holden V8 engine
 Nissan RB engine (Straight six used in the Holden Commodore VL)
 List of GM engines

Notes

References 
 
 

Straight-six engines
Holden engines